The Beatles started out like most other rock and roll bands, employing a standard guitars/bass/drums instrumentation. As their touring days wound down, they became a full-time studio band. Their scope of experimentation grew, as did the  palette of sounds. This article attempts to list the instruments used to achieve those results.

Not listed are instruments played by the Beatles’ session players such as cello, violin, saxophone, trumpet, French horn or the 41-piece orchestra heard on "A Day in the Life".

Guitars
Both John Lennon and George Harrison used the Gibson J-160E, an acoustic guitar with an electric pickup at the base of the fretboard. The resonant character of the full acoustic body, combined with the electric pickup, meant that this guitar was susceptible to feedback, employed to great effect on the intro to "I Feel Fine". Lennon also used a Framus Hootenanny twelve-string acoustic, which can be seen in the movie Help! and heard on the title song and "You've Got to Hide Your Love Away". This twelve-string guitar accounted for audibly richer rhythm guitar parts on songs like these, in comparison to the six-string Gibsons. After Sgt. Pepper's Lonely Hearts Club Band, Lennon moved on to a Martin D-28 from C. F. Martin & Company (alternating between the J-160E and the D-28 for The Beatles) while Harrison upgraded to a Gibson J-200 Jumbo (which Lennon used on "Two of Us" and other acoustic tracks on Let It Be). Harrison later gave the guitar to Bob Dylan in 1969.

Upgrading from a 1959 Höfner Club 40 guitar, purchased from Hessy's Music Shop in Liverpool, Lennon primarily used a Rickenbacker 325 Capri from 1960 until 1964. He purchased the guitar in Hamburg in its original natural finish and used the guitar extensively throughout the Cavern Club performances. In early 1963 he sent the guitar off to be refinished in its more popular black finish. This is the way the guitar appeared on The Ed Sullivan Show performance in February 1964. Shortly thereafter, he upgraded to a brand new Rickenbacker 325, a much-improved version of his 325 Capri. Rickenbacker specially made a 325/12. During the Christmas shows of 1964, Lennon dropped the new Rickenbacker 325 which made a huge crack in the neck and headstock. British instrument distributor Rose Morris sent a replacement Rickenbacker 325 with a sound hole and in a red fire glo finish. The guitar is called a Rickenbacker 325 1996. Lennon used the guitar for the shows until the other 325 was repaired. In 1968 during the recording of The Beatles, drummer Ringo Starr left the group during tensions and when he returned, Lennon gave the Rickenbacker 325 1996 to Starr. He has had it ever since. During the Help! sessions, Lennon and Harrison acquired matching 1961 Fender Stratocasters. Lennon's was used on "Nowhere Man" and sparingly on the Sgt. Pepper album.

Harrison started off in the Cavern Club days playing a black Gretsch Duo Jet. The Duo Jet was refurbished many years later and featured on the cover and album Cloud Nine. In mid 1963 he switched to a Gretsch Country Gentleman and a Gretsch Tennessean, both of which he played until around 1965. His second Country Gentleman was given away to a friend (Harrison was an avid sharer of instruments) and is now retained by Ringo Starr, while his first Country Gentleman fell off the Beatles' van in 1965 and was crushed by a lorry. In 1964 Harrison introduced the electric twelve-string guitar into mainstream pop. His Rickenbacker 360/12 twelve-string was a prototype. Only the second twelve-string guitar Rickenbacker ever made, it was delivered specially to him during their first visit to New York City. Harrison's use of the 12-string inspired Roger McGuinn of the Byrds to start using one too. He also used a Ramirez Classical Guitar which can be heard in "And I Love Her" and seen used throughout the film A Hard Day's Night. Harrison used a Gibson SG around 1966; these can be seen in the promotional videos for "Paperback Writer" and "Rain", in addition to film of the recording session for "Hey Bulldog". He eventually gave this guitar to Pete Ham of Badfinger. Harrison's most prominent guitar from 1967 until early 1969 was a Fender Stratocaster. Obtained and used during the Help! sessions, first used on "Ticket to Ride", it was originally Sonic Blue in colour until Harrison gave it a psychedelic paint job, using, among other substances, his wife's sparkly green nail polish. This psychedelic Stratocaster, dubbed "Rocky", is seen in the "I Am the Walrus" segment of Magical Mystery Tour, and in the "All You Need Is Love" broadcast. Around this time Harrison also used a 1957 Gibson Les Paul model, which was given to him by Eric Clapton and was once in the possession of, among other musicians, John Sebastian of The Lovin' Spoonful. Originally a "gold top" model, the guitar was refinished with a dark red stain before it got to Harrison and was nicknamed "Lucy". The guitar can be seen in the "Revolution" promotional video and the Let It Be film. Also seen in that film is a rosewood Fender Telecaster, given to him by Fender.

Lennon and Harrison both purchased Epiphone Casinos in the spring of 1966. Paul McCartney acquired his Casino in 1964. They were used extensively in the recording of the Revolver album and continued to be used throughout their remaining years along with other instruments. Lennon extensively used his Casino as can be witnessed in the film of their final concert at Candlestick Park in 1966, as well as in the Let it Be film when playing in their studio in London. Lennon's Casino was double-tracked to get sufficient distortion to satisfy Lennon in the intro to Revolution. Although they purchased the guitars with sunburst finishes, both Harrison and Lennon later stripped the finishes off the guitars, claiming it allowed the guitars to "breathe" better. Lennon's stripped-down Casino can be seen in video footage of the famous rooftop concert. Lennon used a Casino almost exclusively from 1966 until the group's break-up and he is even seen with it during the sessions for his Imagine album.

Paul McCartney's electric guitar parts (solos on "Ticket to Ride", "Another Girl", "Taxman", "Drive My Car", "Carry That Weight" and "Good Morning Good Morning" to name a few) were chiefly performed on his own Epiphone Casino or sunburst Fender Esquire. For recordings with acoustic parts played by McCartney ("Yesterday"), he favoured a 1964 Epiphone Texan FT-79. In 1968, he started using a D-28 from C. F. Martin & Company.

Basses
McCartney custom-ordered a left-handed Höfner model 500/1 "violin" bass during one of the group's early residences in Hamburg. This model, with two pickups very close to the neck and almost touching each other, was replaced in 1962 by a 1963 model, whose pickups were spaced much farther apart, in a more conventional manner. McCartney continued to use his early model, although very rarely, until the Get Back sessions, when it probably was stolen from Twickenham Film Studios; he continues to use his 1963 Höfner today. In October 1965 he switched to a Rickenbacker Model 4001S, during the recording of Rubber Soul (as seen in pictures from those sessions), but certainly by the recording of "Paperback Writer". It would be his principal choice for the remainder of the Beatles' career.  He briefly used a left-handed Fender Jazz Bass during sessions for The Beatles double album and again for Abbey Road. He returned to the Höfner during Get Back sessions   and played it during the rooftop concert, but returned to the Rickenbacker for Abbey Road. McCartney continued to use his Rickenbacker in his solo career and with Wings.

He also used his original 1961 Höfner, refinished in three-tone sunburst and with black frame around pickups, to hold them in place. It can be seen in January 2, footage from Get Back sessions and in the Wednesday 4 September 1968 "Revolution" promotional video.

The 1961 bass did show up in the promotional video for "The Ballad of John and Yoko", recorded in May, 1969. But this was compiled from footage of the January 2, 1969, Get Back sessions.

Harrison and Lennon both played a Fender VI to back some songs on which McCartney played piano or guitar.
Harrison was photographed at Abbey Road in 1966 playing a right-handed red Burns Nu-Sonic Bass during the "Paperback Writer" and "Rain" recording sessions, but neither song featured him playing it.
Harrison also played a right-handed Fender Jazz Bass on two songs from Abbey Road.

Keyboards

All four Beatles  contributed keyboard parts to their catalogue, supplemented by George Martin, Mal Evans, Chris Thomas, Nicky Hopkins and  Billy Preston.

 Hohner Pianet N and CH models
 Steinway Vertegrand upright piano
 Baldwin Combo harpsichord
 Baldwin Satin Ebony Grand
 Bechstein D-280 concert grand piano 
 Blüthner Grand Piano
 Challen Piano
 Schiedmayer Celeste
 Mannborg Harmonium
 Moog synthesizer III
 Fender Rhodes Suitcase (‘68)
 Selmer Concert Clavioline
 Hammond RT-3 organ with Leslie Model 122 cabinet
 Hammond C-3 organ
 Hammond L-100
 Lowrey DSO Heritage Deluxe organ
 Mellotron MK II
 Vox Continental organs used on "I'm Down" and others
 Unidentified harpsichord(s?) used on "All You Need Is Love", "Fixing a Hole", "Piggies"
 Unidentified clavichord used on "For No One"

Microphones
Although microphone usage varied somewhat according to the requirements of each song, the group's recordings at Abbey Road most often employed Neumann U47 or U67 microphones for electric guitars and one or more Neumann U47s (unidirectional); U48's "figure eight" (bidirectional) pickup pattern for vocals and most other instruments. The AKG C-12 was used as well, particularly on the bass (speaker) amplifier.  Early in their recording career the drums usually were recorded with only two microphones: one overhead (an AKG D19 or STC 4038) and one for the bass drum (such as an AKG D20). Later, more microphones were used on the drums.
 	 
The AKG C28 is visible in the Let It Be film. Available studio documentation and interviews with their former recording engineers indicate that this microphone was not used for recording in the studio.

With the group's encouragement, recording engineer Geoff Emerick experimented with microphone placement and equalization. Many of his techniques were unusual for the time but have since become commonplace, such as "close miking" (physically placing the microphone very close to a sound source) of acoustic instruments or deliberately overloading the signal to produce distortion. For example, he obtained the biting string sound that characterises "Eleanor Rigby" by miking the instruments extremely closely—Emerick has related that the string players would instinctively back away from the microphones at the start of each take, and he would go back into the studio and move the microphones closer again. The recording of George Harrison's acoustic guitar in "Here Comes the Sun" was another incidence of close miking.

He also used a speaker as a microphone to increase the bass level whereas a microphone would overload from the air pressure.

Drums
Ringo Starr bought a set of Premier drums in 1960, but in June 1963 made the switch to a four-piece Ludwig set. The American-made drums were newly available in England, but the clincher for Starr was the Black Oyster Pearl finish of the Ludwig kit. He used four similar kits altogether, including two that he kept at Abbey Road. The first two Ludwig kits were 20", 12", 14", plus 14" snare and the second two 22",13",16", 14" snare. Starr played a 20" kit on the Ed Sullivan Show debut in February 1964. He changed to the bigger 22" kit at the end of May 1964. Near the end of the sessions for the White Album, he obtained a natural-tone five-piece Ludwig Hollywood set and set it up alongside his existing Black Oyster Pearl bass drum, according to Mal Evans in the November 1968 edition of The Beatles' Monthly.
Starr continued to use the Hollywood kit for the Let It Be and Abbey Road sessions, albeit with a Ludwig Black Oyster Pearl snare rather than the snare with the Hollywood kit, and he used it at the "rooftop concert" as well as his drum solo in "The End". Starr experimented with various muffling techniques. He used Ludwig and Remo drumheads. He started his career playing Paiste cymbals, but switched to Zildjian. He has used Paiste occasionally, most likely due to their easier availability in Europe.

Instruments specific to Rubber Soul sessions
Photographs of these sessions reveal the following gear:

Lennon
 1964 Rickenbacker 325 in Black finish (given to Lennon by Rickenbacker at the Deauville Hotel, Miami Beach, Florida on 14 February 1964)
 1964 Gibson J-160E sunburst finish acoustic-electric guitar (purchased during the September 1964 US tour. Modified for the Rubber Soul sessions by moving the pick-up to the bridge side of the sound hole)
 1961 Fender Stratocaster in Sonic Blue finish (purchased by Mal Evans during the making of the Help! album)
 1965 Framus Hootenanny 5/024 acoustic 12 string guitar
 1965 Epiphone Casino

McCartney
 1963 Höfner 500/1 Violin Bass (purchased by McCartney in October 1963)
 1962 Epiphone Casino E230TD in sunburst finish (modified for playing left-handed)
 1964 Epiphone Texan FT-79 acoustic guitar (also modified for playing left-handed)
 1965 Rickenbacker 4001S left-handed bass guitar in fireglo (red sunburst) finish, given to McCartney by Rickenbacker at Burt Lancaster's house in Benedict Canyon, Hollywood, during the week beginning 23 August 1965.
 1965 Tone Bender fuzz-box

Harrison
 1957 Gretsch Duo Jet 
 1958 Futurama Resonet Grazioso
 1962 Gretsch Chet Atkins Country Gentleman and 1963 Gretsch Country Gentleman
 1962–63 Gretsch Tennessean Chet Atkins electric guitar (purchased the previous year)
 1962 Gibson J-160E sunburst finish acoustic-electric guitar (purchased on hire purchase from Rushworths, Liverpool in June 1962. Brian Epstein settled the bill a year later (As with Lennon's J-160E, this guitar was modified for the Rubber Soul sessions by moving the pick-up to the bridge side of the sound hole).
 1965 Rickenbacker 360/12 fireglo (red sunburst) finish electric 12-string guitar (custom built and presented to Harrison on 21 August 1965 at a press conference in Minneapolis, Minnesota, by radio station WDGY in association with local music store B-Sharp Music)
 1961 Fender Stratocaster in Sonic Blue finish (purchased by Mal Evans at the same time as Lennon's)
 Sitar (a cheap model purchased by Harrison from India Craft in London in 1965)
 1964 Ramirez Classical Guitar
 1965 Epiphone Casino sanded to a natural finish in 1968. John and George both sanded off the finish being told it would sound better. Quote, "In early '68, the Beatles headed to Rishikesh, India, to study transcendental meditation with the Maharishi and friends, including Donovan Leitch. There, Donovan convinced the trio to sand the finish off their instruments, telling them how a guitar sounds better without a heavy finish. After returning to London, during sessions for the self-titled White Album, Lennon and Harrison sanded their Casinos. Lennon primarily played his newly stripped Casino for the sessions. Harrison said that once they'd removed the finish, they became much better guitars. 'I think that works on a lot of guitars', he explained. 'If you take the paint and varnish off and get the bare wood, it seems to sort of breathe'."
1968 Rosewood Fender Telecaster custom made by Fender (as seen on the Rooftop Concert)

Starr
 Ludwig Super Classic drum kit in Oyster Black Pearl finish with 22-inch kick drum (presented to Starr by Ludwig in New York City on 13 August 1965)

Amplifiers
 Three 1964 Vox AC-100 amplifiers (prototypes given to the Beatles by Vox at The Futurist Theatre, Scarborough on 9 August 1964)
 1962 Vox AC-15 Twin amplifier
 Two 1963 Vox AC-30 amplifiers
 Two 1965 Vox AC-100 guitar amplifiers
 1965 Vox AC-100 bass amplifier
 1963–4 Fender Bassman amplifier

Keyboards
 1965 Vox Continental Portable Organ
 1964 Hohner Pianet C
 Steinway grand piano
 Challen upright piano
 Hammond RT-3 organ, with Leslie 145 rotating speaker cabinet and Leslie 147 power amp
 Harmonium
 Fender Rhodes piano as seen used by Billy Preston on the Rooftop Concert

Miscellaneous
George Harrison owned many Indian instruments, including tambouras, a swarmandel (or Indian harp) and at least three sitars. All the Beatles kept pianos, guitars and other instruments at their homes to work on songs and demos. Most of these pieces never made their way into the studio with the well-known exception of Harrison's Moog synthesizer. Lennon's home Mellotron was never brought into the studio, though a Mellotron was rented for use during the Sgt. Pepper sessions and an Abbey Road Studios-owned Mellotron was used for the White Album. Both Harrison and Lennon were given Coral electric sitars. Other instruments were recorder, harmonica, banjo, trumpet, saxophone, glockenspiel, vibraphone, accordion, comb and paper, and assorted percussion (congas, bongos, Arabian loose-skin bongo, African drum, timpani, anvil, package case, maracas, tambourine, zill, güiro).

Pop culture references
The "Beatle" style instruments have been used many times in pop culture. In Agent Cody Banks 2 during the fight scene, there is a display of the original instruments and Agent Banks uses Paul McCartney's Höfner bass to hit the villain. The instruments have also been replicated into plastic game controllers for the game The Beatles Rock Band.

The Beatles as a five-piece, 1960–1961

+ Chas Newby (December 1960 only), deputising for Sutcliffe
++ Tommy Moore (January–June 1960), Norman Chapman (July 1960), Pete Best (August 1960)

The Beatles as a four-piece live and in the studio, 1961–1966

+ Ringo Starr replaced Pete Best in August 1962

See also
 List of Gibson players
 John Lennon's musical instruments

Notes

References

Bibliography

External links
Paul McCartney 1993 interview for Guitar magazine

 
Beatles